John Francis Buckley (November 26, 1891 – November 27, 1931) was a barrister, soldier, and Canadian federal politician, born in  Butte, Montana.

Buckley served in World War I with the Princess Patricia's Canadian Light Infantry from 1915 to 1918.

Buckley ran for the House of Commons of Canada and was elected in the 1930 Canadian federal election. He defeated Incumbent Donald Ferdinand Kellner in a close 3-way race. A year into his term, Buckley died in a car accident at St. Paul, Alberta when his vehicle struck a team of horses pulling a carriage.

References

External links
 

1891 births
1931 deaths
Members of the House of Commons of Canada from Alberta
Liberal Party of Canada MPs
Canadian military personnel of World War I
Politicians from Butte, Montana
American emigrants to Canada
Road incident deaths in Canada
Accidental deaths in Alberta
Military personnel from Montana
Princess Patricia's Canadian Light Infantry soldiers